Torhild Skogsholm (born 18 October 1959, in Bodø) is a Norwegian politician (Liberal Party). She was Minister of Transport and Communications from 2001 to 2005. She is now the director of the Oslo tram company Oslo Sporvognsdrift.

Skogsholm graduated in economics (Cand.Oecon.) at the University of Oslo, 1988.

References

1959 births
Living people
Politicians from Bodø
Liberal Party (Norway) politicians
Ministers of Transport and Communications of Norway
Women government ministers of Norway